Minor league baseball teams were based in Maysville, Kentucky in various seasons between 1894 and 1923. Maysville teams played as members of the Tri-State League in 1894, Blue Grass League from 1910 to 1912, Ohio State League from 1913 to 1916 and Blue Grass League from 1922 to 1923, winning one league championship. Maysville hosted home minor league games at the Maysville Base Ball Park/League Park. Baseball Hall of Fame member Casey Stengel played for the 1910 Maysville Rivermen in his first professional season.

History
Early amateur Maysville teams began play in 1860 with the Maysville Town Ball Club. In the 1890s, a Maysville amateur team reportedly won a three–game series against the Cincinnati Reds.

Maysville first hosted minor league baseball in 1894, when the Maysville team played as members of the Tri-State League. The 1894 league records are unknown.

On August 24, 1910, the Shelbyville Grays franchise of the Class D level Blue Grass League relocated to Maysville, Kentucky, finishing the 1910 season playing as the Maysville Rivermen. Reports state that Maysville owners purchased the Shelbyville franchise for $500.00. The owners of the Maysville team were local citizens, headed up by businessmen, J.W. Fitzgerald and Preston Wells. The Rivermen had a record of 3–24 after the move to Maysville. In 1910, Maysville businesses offered gifts to players who hit home runs. The Shelbyville/Maysville team finished last, in 6th place, with a 37–89 overall record and were 42.5 games behind the 1st place Paris Bourbonites in the final standings. Anton Kuhn and Daniel Collins managed the 1910 team.

Baseball Hall of Fame inductee Casey Stengel played for the 1910 Shelbyville Grays/Maysville Rivermen at age 19, hitting .223 for the team in 69 games and 233 at–bats, after beginning the 1910 season with the Kankakee Kays. During the season, Stengel hit a home run and received a box of candy and a Duplex Safety-razor outfit. A young Maysville boy named Robert Willocks would carry Stengel's spikes and glove to the ballpark where Stengel would get him into the game for free.

Maysville continued play in the 1911 Blue Grass League season. An opening day parade featured Blue Grass League President Dr. W.C. Ussery. Maysville Mayor J.W. Lee threw out the first pitch and declared the day a business holiday. A crowd of 3,000 saw Maysville beat the Paris Bourbonites. The Maryville Rivermen finished with a record of 55–63, placing 4th under manager James Carmoney. Maysville finished the season 17.5 games behind the 1st place Paris Bourbonites.
 
The 1912 Maysville Rivermen placed 2nd in the Blue Grass league, finishing 4.0 games behind the 1st place Frankfort Lawmakers. In 1912, the Mt. Olivet band played at the Maysville Rivermen season home opener. Maysville was under the direction of owner Thomas Russell. With a 82–47 record under managers James Carmoney and Harry Kunkel, the Rivermen finished behind Frankfort's 85–42 record. They were followed by the Lexington Colts (60–65), Paris Bourbonites (60–69), Richmond Pioneers (66–64) and Mount Sterling Orphans (31–97). The Blue Grass League folded following the 1912 season.

Maysville continued minor league play in 1913. The Maysville Angles became members of the 1913 eight–team Class D level Ohio State League. With a 38–96 record, Maysville placed 8th and last in the league, ending the season 46.0 games behind the 1st place Chillicothe Babes. The 1913 Maysville manager was Frank Moore.

The 1914 Maysville Angels disbanded from the eight–team Ohio State League during the season. Maysville folded on July 22, 1914, after beating Huntington 2–1. At the time, the team had a record of 30–51 under managers Ollie Chapman and Roy Montgomery.

After the 1915 season began, Maysville resumed play during the season in the six–team Ohio State League and played in the league finals. The Chillicothe Babes, with a 27–34 record, moved to Huntington, West Virginia on July 13, 1915. After just six games, Huntington (2–4) moved to Maysville on July 19, 1915. The team finished the season with an overall record of 58–55, to place 3rd in the regular season under manager Josh Devore, finishing 13.0 games behind the 1st place Portsmouth Cobblers. In the Finals, the Portsmouth Cobblers defeated Maysville 4 games to 1. The 1916 Ohio State League members were the Charleston Senators (58–63), Chillicothe Babes/Huntington/Maysville Angels (58–55), Frankfort Old Taylors (45–65), Ironton Nailers (47–69), Lexington Colts (63–48) and Portsmouth Cobblers (71–42).

The Ohio State League permanently folded on July 19, 1916, with the Maysville Burley Cubs as a league member. At the time the Ohio State League folded, the Cubs had a 26–36 record and were in 4th place, finishing 19.0 games behind the 1st place Portsmouth Truckers. The 1916 Cubs' manager was Jimmy Jones.

Maysville won a championship in 1922. Maysville returned to play in the Class D level Blue Grass League, which reformed as a six–team league. The Maysville Cardinals, owned again by Thomas Russell, finished the regular season in second place with a 33–28 record under manager Norbert Bosken. The Maysville Cardinals, with a 16–6 record, won the 1st half standings and the Cynthiana Merchants, with a 25–17 record, won the 2nd half standings, as the Blue Grass league played a split–season schedule in 1922. In the Finals, Maysville defeated the Cynthiana Merchants three games to one to win the 1922 Blue Grass League Championship.

In their final season of play, the Maysville Cardinals placed third in the 1923 Blue Grass League standings. Maysville had a record of 48–45 under returning manager Norbert Bosken, finishing 3.0 games behind the 1st place Cynthiana Cobblers. The standings were led by the Cynthiana Cobblers (54-43), followed by the Winchester Dodgers (53–44), Maysville Cardinals (48–45), Paris Bourbons (45–47), Lexington Reos (44–49) and Mount Sterling Essex (38–54). Maysville permanently folded following the 1923 season. Maysville has not hosted another minor league team.

The ballpark
Beginning in 1910, Maysville teams were noted to have played home games at the Maysville Base Ball Park. The ballpark was also called "League Park." Reportedly there was an asylum across from the ballpark, where patients would watch games and cheer the players. The ballpark was located between East 2nd Street & 3rd Streets at Houston Avenue, Maysville, Kentucky.

Timeline

Year-by-year records

Notable alumni

Baseball Hall of Fame alumni
Casey Stengel (1910) Inducted, 1966

Notable alumni
Paul Carter (1913)
Bill Cramer (1910)
Lee Dashner (1913)
Hank DeBerry (1915)
Josh Devore (1915, MGR)
Frank Emmer (1915)
Ed Glenn (1910)
Charlie Grover (1911–1912)
Emil Huhn (1910)
Jim Jones (1916, MGR)
George Kircher (1910)
Howard McGraner (1915–1916)
Ray Miner (1922)
Frank Moore (1913, MGR)
Skeeter Shelton (1911)
Scottie Slayback (1922)
John Singleton (1915–1916)
Jack Snyder (1911–1912)
Ed Sperber (1916)
Carl Weilman (1912)
Harry Williams (1911–1912)
Matt Zeiser (1915)

See also
Maysville (minor league baseball) playersMaysville Angels playersMaysville Rivermen players

References

External links
Baseball Reference

Maysville, Kentucky
Defunct baseball teams in Kentucky